This is a list of notable South Korean idol groups that debuted in the 2010s. Only groups that have an article in Wikipedia are listed here.

2010

Coed School
DMTN
F.Cuz
Girl's Day
GD & TOP
GP Basic
Homme
Infinite
JYJ
Led Apple
Miss A
Nine Muses
One Way
Orange Caramel
Rooftop Moonlight
Rhythm Power
Sistar
Standing Egg
Teen Top
Touch
The Boss
ZE:A

2011

AA
Apeace
Apink
B1A4
Blady
Block B
Boyfriend
Brave Girls
C-REAL
Chocolat
Clover
Dal Shabet
F-ve Dolls
Geeks
Kim Heechul & Kim Jungmo 
M.I.B
Myname
N-Sonic
N-Train
Rania
Sistar19
Stellar
Super Junior-D&E 
Trouble Maker 
Ulala Session

2012

100%
15&
24K
A.cian
A-Jax
A-Prince
AOA
B.A.P
Big Star
BtoB
C-Clown
Crayon Pop
Cross Gene
D-Unit
EvoL
EXID
Exo
Fiestar
Gangkiz
Girls' Generation-TTS
Glam
Hello Venus
Honey G
JJ Project
Lunafly
Mr.Mr.
NU'EST
Phantom
Puretty
She'z
Skarf
Spica
Sunny Days
Tahiti
Tasty
The SeeYa
Tiny-G
Two X
VIXX
Wonder Boyz

2013

2Eyes
2Yoon
5urprise
AlphaBat
AOA Black
Bestie
Boys Republic
BTS
GI
History
Infinite H
Ladies' Code
LC9
M.Pire
QBS
Royal Pirates
Soohyun & Hoon 
Speed
T-ara N4 
Topp Dogg
Wassup

2014

2000 Won
4L
4Ten
AKMU
Almeng
B.I.G
Badkiz
Be.A
Beatwin
Berry Good
Bigflo
Bob Girls
Bursters
D.Holic
GD X Taeyang
Got7
HALO
HeartB
Hi Suhyun
High4
Hotshot
Infinite F 
JJCC
Laboum
Lip Service
Lovelyz
Madtown
Mamamoo
Melody Day
Minx
Nasty Nasty 
Play the Siren
Red Velvet
Sonamoo
Strawberry Milk
The Barberettes
The Legend
ToHeart 
Troy
Uniq
Wings
Winner
Year 7 Class 1

2015

1Punch
April
Bastarz
CLC
Day6
DIA
GFriend
IKon
MAP6
MAS
Monsta X
MyB
N.Flying
Oh My Girl
Playback
Romeo
Rubber Soul
Seventeen
Snuper
Twice
Unicorn
UP10TION
VAV
VIXX LR

2016

AOA Cream
Astro
Blackpink
Bolbbalgan4
Boys24
BtoB Blue
CocoSori
Double S 301
Exo-CBX
Gugudan
I.B.I
I.O.I
Imfact
KNK
MASC
MOBB
Momoland
NCT
NCT U
NCT 127
NCT Dream
Nine Muses A
Pentagon
SF9
The East Light
Unnies
Victon
Vromance
WJSN

2017

 14U
 3RACHA
 A.C.E
 Be.A
 Busters
 Dreamcatcher
 Duetto
 Elris
 Favorite
 Golden Child
 Good Day
 GreatGuys
 Hash Tag
 Highlight
 Honeyst
 Hyeongseop X Euiwoong
 IN2IT
 IZ
 JBJ
 Kard
 Longguo & Shihyun
 M.O.N.T
 Mind U
 MVP
 MXM
 Myteen
 NU'EST W
 ONF
 P.O.P
 Pristin
 Rainz
 S.I.S
 Seven O'Clock
 The Boyz
 The Rose
 TRCNG
 Triple H
 TST
 Varsity
 Wanna One
 Weki Meki

2018

 A Train To Autumn
 Ateez
 D-Crunch
 Dream Note
 Fromis 9
 (G)I-dle
 Girlkind
 Gugudan SeMiNa
 GWSN
 Honey Popcorn
 Iz*One
 JBJ95
 K/DA
 Loona
 Maywish
 Nature
 NeonPunch
 Noir
 NTB
 Oh!GG
 Pink Fantasy
 Pristin V
 Saturday
 Spectrum
 Stray Kids
 Target
 UNB
 Uni.T
 W24
 We Girls
 WJMK
 Xeno-T

2019

 1Team
 1the9
 3YE
 AB6IX
 Ariaz
 Argon
 BDC
 Bvndit
 Cherry Bullet
 CIX
 D1CE
 DKZ
 ENOi
 Everglow
 Exo-SC
 Fanatics
 Hinapia
 Hoppipolla 
 Itzy
 Jus2
 Newkidd
 Oneus
 Onewe
 OnlyOneOf
 Purple Rain 
 Purplebeck
 Rocket Punch
 SuperM
 Teen Teen
 Tomorrow X Together
 Vanner
 Verivery
 We in the Zone
 Wooseok x Kuanlin
 X1

See also
 List of South Korean idol groups (1990s)
 List of South Korean idol groups (2000s)
 List of South Korean idol groups (2020s)

 
Lists of South Korean bands
2010s in South Korean music